Phoebe L. Zarnetske is a community ecologist and associate professor at Michigan State University. Her work focuses on the ecological and evolutionary mechanisms that shape natural communities across multiple spatial scales.

Education and career 
Zarnetske received her B.A. in biology with a concentration in environmental science from Colby College in 2001. She received her M.S. in ecology at Utah State University in 2006. In 2011, she earned a Ph.D. from Oregon State University.  She was a Graduate Fellow National State Foundation's Integrative Graduate Education and Research Traineeship (IGERT) Ecosystem Informatics. She also was a Postdoctoral Fellow, Yale Climate and Energy Institute at Yale University from 2011-2013. In 2013, Zarnetske joined Michigan State University, and was promoted to associate professor in the Department of Integrative Biology in 2020.

Research

Zarnetske research interests center on examining how ecological communities respond to climate change and invasive species. Her Ph.D. research examined feedbacks between grass invasions and the shape of dunes. She has contributed to our understanding of how climate change impacts species and communities and described the biotic multipliers of climate change by considering which species are most likely to be under threat. Zarnetske has contributed to the field of spatial and community ecology by examining the effect of biotic interactions and environmental conditions on the spread of non-native species and their impact on resident communities. Zarnetske and Jessica Gurevitch lead the Climate Intervention Biology Working Group which gathers scientists working at the intersection of climate research and ecology, and in 2021 Zarnetske led a publication in the Proceedings of the National Academy of Sciences presenting knowledge gaps on the ecological impacts of Stratospheric aerosol injection on the natural world.

Selected publications

Awards and honors 

 Harper Prize, Journal of Ecology (2014) for Zarnetske et al. (2013) paper       
 Hatfield Marine Science Center, Best Poster at Markham Research Symposium (2007)
 The Wildlife Society, Utah Chapter Best Poster Award (2006)
 Ecological Society of America (ESA), E. Lucy Braun Award (2005)
 Maine Water Conference, Best Student Research Poster (2001)

References

External links 

Colby College alumni
Living people
Year of birth missing (living people)
Utah State University alumni
Oregon State University alumni
American women scientists
21st-century American women